Cattle Empire is a 1958 American Western DeLuxe Color movie in CinemaScope directed by Charles Marquis Warren, starring Joel McCrea and released by 20th Century Fox. The film also features Gloria Talbott, Don Haggerty, Phyllis Coates, and Bing Russell and serves as something of a forerunner for director Warren's subsequent television series Rawhide starring Eric Fleming and Clint Eastwood, which used the picture's writer Endre Bohem, as well as some of its supporting cast (Paul Brinegar, Steve Raines, Rocky Shahan, and Charles H. Gray).

Plot
The story starts with John Cord (Joel McCrea) apprehended by the townsfolk, who have lynched him, and are dragging him through the streets with the intent to kill him. Cord is despised for a range of things done to the town by men for whom he was responsible  when they went on a wild drunken rampage.

Cord is saved from death by Ralph, a prominent cattle owner and major businessman of the town, who turns up with his wife and his brother. Ralph is blind, and Cord is shown to be responsible for that, as well. Despite this, Ralph reveals that he has, in fact, invited Cord to the town. As the most experienced cattle man in the area, he is the only one who can drive the townsfolks and his cattle to Fort Sumter, where they can be sold. The town is on the verge of economic collapse, and the sale of the cattle will save the town.

Cord is a skilled cattleman and one of the few people capable of driving the cattle across land, at a time of the year when little grass is available and many of the rivers are dry. He initially refuses the offer from Ralph. He later meets the rival of Ralph, Garth, who wants to drive his own cattle across town. Cord instead accepts an offer from Garth to drive the cattle, and then goes back to accept the offer from Ralph, as well, secretly plotting his revenge against the townsfolk, while committing to get Garth's cattle to Fort Sumter first. 
He departs the town on the cattledrive with Ralph, his wife, many of the townsfolk who tried to kill him, and a young girl who is in love with him.
Things occur on the cattle drive, though, which lead Cord to reconsider.

Cast
 Joel McCrea as John Cord
 Gloria Talbott as Sandy Jeffrey
 Don Haggerty as Ralph Hamilton
 Phyllis Coates as Janice Hamilton
 Bing Russell as Douglas Hamilton
 Richard Shannon as Garth
 Paul Brinegar as Tom Jefferson Jeffrey
 Charles H. Gray as Tom Powis (billed as Charles Gray)
 Hal K. Dawson as George Washington Jeffrey
 Patrick O'Moore as Rex Cogswell
 Duane Grey as Juan Aruzza
 William McGraw as Jim Whittaker (billed as Bill McGraw)
 Jack Lomas as Sheriff Brewster
 Nesdon Booth as Barkeep

References

External links
 
 
 
 

1958 films
1958 Western (genre) films
American Western (genre) films
Films directed by Charles Marquis Warren
Films scored by Paul Sawtell
1950s English-language films
1950s American films